Marcos Churio (born 4 October 1900) was an Argentine professional golfer.

Churio was born in Mar del Plata. He turned professional in 1920, and competed in Europe between 1931 and 1939, where his best tournament finish was 5th place in the 1931 Southport Open in England. That year, he was 7th in the British Open at Carnoustie.

Churio's brother, Pedro, won several tournaments in Argentina and later designed many golf courses. His nephew, Martin Pose, won the French Open in 1939.

Churio won the Argentine Open in three decades, in 1926, 1934 and 1943. He also finished runner-up on six occasions, in 1928, 1929, 1932, 1935, 1936 and 1937.

Professional wins

Argentine wins (16)
1925 Buenos Aires Professional Tournament
1926 Argentine PGA Championship, Argentine Open
1928 South Open
1929 South Open
1930 Argentine PGA Championship
1931 South Open, Center Open, Argentine PGA Championship
1932 Abierto del Litoral, Argentine PGA Championship
1934 Argentine Open
1941 Abierto del Litoral, Mendoza Open
1942 South Open
1943 Argentine Open

Other wins (2)
1926 Uruguay Open
1939 Uruguay Open

Team appearances
Great Britain–Argentina Professional Match (representing Argentina): 1939

References

Argentine male golfers
1900 births
Year of death unknown